The puna canastero (Asthenes sclateri) is a species of bird in the family Furnariidae.
It is found in Argentina, Bolivia and Peru.
Its natural habitats are temperate grassland and subtropical or tropical high-altitude grassland. Five subspecies are recognized:
Asthenes sclateri punensis (von Berlepsch & Stolzmann, 1901) - Bolivia and Peru
Asthenes sclateri cuchacanchae (Chapman, 1921) - Bolivia and northwest Argentina (Salta)
Asthenes sclateri sclateri (Cabanis, 1878) - Sierra de Córdoba of central Argentina
Asthenes sclateri brunnescens Nores & Yzurieta, 1983 - Sierra de San Luis of central Argentina

References

puna canastero
Birds of the Puna grassland
puna canastero
Taxonomy articles created by Polbot
Taxobox binomials not recognized by IUCN